Rough Times is the fourth studio album by German rock band Kadavar, released on 29 September 2017 by Nuclear Blast.

Track listing

Charts

References

2017 albums
Kadavar albums